Ryan Thomas Kalkbrenner (born January 17, 2002) is an American college basketball player for the Creighton Bluejays of the Big East Conference from Florissant, MO.

High school career
Kalkbrenner played basketball for Trinity Catholic High School in St. Louis, Missouri. As a junior, he averaged 13.9 points, 7.6 rebounds and 3.9 blocks per game, earning AAA Player of the Year and Class 3 All-State honors. Kalkbrenner competed for Mac Irvin Fire on the Amateur Athletic Union circuit, and was named Nike Elite Youth Basketball League Defensive Player of the Year in 2019. In his senior season, Kalkbrenner averaged 16.3 points, 11 rebounds and 5.7 blocks per game, repeating as a Class 3 All-State selection. A consensus four-star recruit, he committed to playing college basketball for Creighton over offers from Stanford, Purdue and Kansas.

College career
Kalkbrenner came off the bench in his freshman season at Creighton. On December 17, 2020, he recorded a season-high 15 points and five rebounds in a 94–76 win over St. John's. As a freshman, Kalkbrenner averaged 5.9 points, 3.5 rebounds and 1.2 blocks per game, leading all Big East freshmen in blocks. On February 12, 2022, he scored a career-high 22 points and had 15 rebounds in an 80–66 win against Georgetown. Kalkbrenner was named Honorable Mention All-Big East as well as Defensive Player of the Year. He suffered a knee injury in a 72-69 overtime win over San Diego State in the NCAA Tournament, ending his season. Kalkbrenner averaged 13.1 points and 7.7 rebounds per game.

During the following NCAA tournament, Kalkbrenner scored a career-high 31 points during a 72–63 first round win over NC State.

National team career
Kalkbrenner represented the United States at the 2021 FIBA Under-19 World Cup in Latvia. He averaged 5.9 points, four rebounds and 1.3 blocks per game, helping his team win the gold medal.

Career statistics

College

|-
| style="text-align:left;"| 2020–21
| style="text-align:left;"| Creighton
| 31 || 0 || 13.8 || .645 || .000 || .489 || 3.5 || .3 || .2 || 1.2 || 5.9
|-
| style="text-align:left;"| 2021–22
| style="text-align:left;"| Creighton
| 34 || 34 || 29.4 || .646 || .250 || .736 || 7.7 || .9 || .4 || 2.6 || 13.1
|- class="sortbottom"
| style="text-align:center;" colspan="2"| Career
| 65 || 34 || 22.0 || .645 || .214 || .672 || 5.7 || .6 || .3 || 2.0 || 9.6

References

External links
Creighton Bluejays bio
USA Basketball bio

2002 births
Living people
American men's basketball players
Basketball players from St. Louis
Centers (basketball)
Creighton Bluejays men's basketball players